Adel Djerrar (born 3 March 1990) is an Algerian footballer who plays for Al-Nasr SC as a midfielder.

References

External links

1990 births
Living people
Association football midfielders
Algerian footballers
JS Kabylie players
People from Boumerdès
People from Boumerdès District
People from Boumerdès Province
Kabyle people
Algerian Ligue Professionnelle 1 players
RC Relizane players
CA Bordj Bou Arréridj players
21st-century Algerian people